Senatobia Creek is a stream in the U.S. state of Mississippi.

Senatobia is a name derived from the Choctaw language purported to mean "white sycamore".

References

Rivers of Mississippi
Rivers of Panola County, Mississippi
Rivers of Tate County, Mississippi
Mississippi placenames of Native American origin